Oebisfelde is a town and a former municipality in the Börde district in Saxony-Anhalt, Germany. Since 1 January 2010, it is part of the town Oebisfelde-Weferlingen. It is accessed by Bundesstraße (German federal highway) 188.

Geography 
Oebisfelde is in the Altmark/Magdeburg Börde area. It borders on Lower Saxony, across the Aller river. East of Oebisfelde is the Drömling Nature Park.

Subdivisions 
 Bergfriede
 Breitenrode
 Buchhorst
 Gehrendorf
 Lockstedt
 Niendorf
 Wassensdorf
 Weddendorf

History
Between 1945 and 1990 the Oebisfelde railway station served as an East German inner German border crossing for rail transport. In Oebisfelde's component village of Buchhorst there was an East German border crossing for inland navigation on the Mittellandkanal, only open for freight vessels. The traffic between the Soviet Zone of occupation in Germany (until 1949, thereafter the East German Democratic Republic, or West Berlin and the British zone of occupation) and Federal Republic of Germany was subject to the Interzonal traffic regulations, which, between West Germany and West Berlin, followed the special regulations of the Transit Agreement (1972).

Twinnings 
 Lidzbark Welski, Poland

Sites of interest 
 The 10th century Oebisfelde water castle
 Naturpark Drömling

External links
 http://www.oebisfelde.info (in German)

Former municipalities in Saxony-Anhalt
Oebisfelde-Weferlingen
Inner German border